Mount Crowder is a prominent mountain,  high, located  northeast of Mount Tararua in the Monteath Hills of the Victory Mountains. It was mapped by the United States Geological Survey from surveys and from U.S. Navy air photos, 1960–64, and named by the Advisory Committee on Antarctic Names for Dwight F. Crowder, a geologist at Hallett Station in the summer of 1964–65.

References 

Mountains of Victoria Land
Borchgrevink Coast